The Wizard of Oz is a 1950 half-hour television adaptation with puppets of L. Frank Baum's famous 1900 novel, directed by Burr Tillstrom, famous for creating the TV show Kukla, Fran and Ollie.

It was telecast live on May 22, 1950, by NBC. A print of the show is preserved in 16 mm. It is not to be confused with the 1939 full-length classic MGM film starring Judy Garland, which was first telecast by CBS in 1956.

References

External links

1950 films
1950 short films
American black-and-white films
Canadian black-and-white films
English-language Canadian films
Films based on The Wizard of Oz